Ingrid Elena Cruz Toro (born 1 July 1975 in Antofagasta) is a Chilean actress, known for her roles in Brujas (2005), Somos los Carmona (2013-2014), Pituca sin Lucas (2014-2015) and Demente (2021).

Biography 
Born as Ingrid Elena Cruz Toro, in Antofagasta, on July 1, 1975, she is the daughter of Norman Cruz, a notary and real estate conservator in the city, and Sara Toro, a secretary. Her father is from El Salvador, he came to Chile after the war. He studied as a lawyer in Antofagasta.

Her studies were carried out at the Experimental Artistic Lyceum and at the Colegio Instituto Santa María Antofagasta. She later moved to Santiago to study acting at the Fernando González Mardones Theater Club Academy, graduating in 1998. In 2007, she had her first daughter with Leo Scheinffelt, Emilia Scheinffelt. In 2014, she separated from Leo, staying alone with Emilia.

Career 
Ingrid Cruz made her television debut with the telenovela Marparaíso (1998) on Canal 13 , sharing credits with Cristián Campos and Jorge Zabaleta. Next, she worked for ten years at Canal 13, under the orders of Verónica Saquel.

During this period, she appeared in commercially successful telenovelas such as Machos in 2003, Brujas in 2005 and Lola in 2007, in which she became known despite not having a leading role. In 2009, Canal 13 decided not to renew Cruz's contract, because they preferred to promote actresses with greater prominence in the television industry, as was the case with Tamara Acosta and Blanca Lewin.

After a time without many appearances on television, María Eugenia Rencoret gives her the opportunity to antagonize the daytime soap opera Esperanza (2011), with great success. Since then, she has been directing her career towards a more commercial side, becoming an advertising face. She would continue on TVN in the evening Reserva de familia (2012) and with the evening show Somos los Carmona (2013).

In 2014, Cruz emigrated to Mega together with Rencoret, who forms a new dramatic area for the channel. Íngrid gets the main antagonist in the evening show Pituca sin Lucas (2014), which ends up being a hit for the timeslot. She would continue to be linked to Mega in various productions; She also served as a judge on the show The Switch on the same channel. She recently starred in Mega's Demente, as Javiera Cáceres alongside Patricia Rivadeneira, who played Flavia Betantcourt.

Personal life 
Ingrid has a daughter, Emilia.

Filmography

Series

Programs

Films

Television

Telenovelas

Music Videos

Theatre 

 Un dios salvaje (2013)

Advertising 

 Tottus ( 2012 -present), along with Iván Zamorano (2014-2015) and Álvaro Rudolphy (2015-2016).

Awards and nominations

Acknowledgements 

 1994 - Queen of the City of Antofagasta .

Sources

External links 

Ingrid Cruz on Twitter

Ingrid Cruz on Instagram

1975 births
People from Antofagasta Region
Living people
Chilean film actresses
Chilean television actresses
Chilean stage actresses
The Switch Drag Race